Bondei is a Northeast Coast Bantu of Tanzania closely related to Shambala.

External links 
 Collections for a handbook of the Boondéi language By Herbert Willoughby Woodward (1882)

References

Northeast Coast Bantu languages